Nilo Cruz is a Cuban-American playwright and pedagogue. With his award of the 2003 Pulitzer Prize for Drama for his play Anna in the Tropics, he became the second Latino so honored, after Nicholas Dante.

Biography

Early years
Cruz was born in 1960 to Tina and Nilo Cruz, Sr. in Matanzas, Cuba. The family immigrated to Little Havana in Miami, Florida, in 1970 on a Freedom Flight, and eventually naturalised to the United States. His interest in theater began with acting and directing in the early 1980s. He studied theater first at Miami-Dade Community College, later moving to New York City, where Cruz studied under fellow Cuban María Irene Fornés. Fornes recommended Cruz to Paula Vogel who was teaching at Brown University where he would later receive his M.F.A. in 1994.
Cruz is openly gay.

Career
In 2001, Cruz served as the playwright-in-residence for the New Theatre in Coral Gables, Florida, where he wrote Anna in the Tropics.  Rafael de Acha, produced and directed the world premier performance of Anna in the Tropics, winner of the 2003 Pulitzer and the Steinberg Award for Best New Play. A year later it received its Broadway premiere with Jimmy Smits in the lead role.

Some of the theatres that have developed and performed his works include New York's Public Theater, New York Theatre Workshop, Pasadena Playhouse, McCarter Theatre, Oregon Shakespeare Festival, South Coast Repertory, The Alliance, New Theatre, Florida Stage and the Coconut Grove Playhouse.

Cruz wrote the book of the Frank Wildhorn-Jack Murphy musical Havana.  Its scheduled world premiere at the Pasadena Playhouse has been delayed by the theatre's declaration of bankruptcy in 2010.

Cruz has been the recipient of numerous awards and fellowships, including two NEA/TCG National Theatre Artist Residency grants, a Rockefeller Foundation grant, San Francisco's W. Alton Jones award, a Kennedy Center Fund for New American Plays award and a USA Artist Fellowship.

Cruz is a frequent collaborator with Peruvian-American composer Gabriela Lena Frank.  To date, they have completed a set of orchestral songs, La centinela y la paloma (The Keeper and the Dove), for soprano Dawn Upshaw and the St. Paul Chamber Orchestra (premiered under the baton of Joana Carneiro in February 2011); The Saint Maker for soprano Jessica Rivera, mezzo-soprano Rachel Calloway, the San Francisco Girls Chorus, and the Berkeley Symphony in May 2013; Journey of the Shadow for narrator and ensemble of eleven players (San Francisco Chamber Orchestra premiering in April 2013; the Conquest Requiem for soprano, baritone, orchestra, and chorus for the Houston Symphony under the baton of Andrés Orozco-Estrada in May 2017 which will be recorded by the Nashville Symphony in November 2022 for the Naxos label; and Cinco Lunas de Lorca (The Five Moons of Lorca) as a digital short for countertenor, choir, and piano for the Los Angeles Opera. Their newest project is El último sueño de Frida y Diego (The Last Dream of Frida and Diego), a two-act opera commissioned by San Diego Opera and San Francisco Opera with a premiere in October 2022.

Cruz penned the libretto to composer Jimmy López's opera Bel Canto which had its world premiere at the Lyric Opera of Chicago on December 7, 2015.

Cruz's most recent work is Bathing in Moonlight, a world premiere featuring Raul Mendez, Priscilla Lopez, Hannia Guillen, Frankie J. Alvarez, Michael Rudko, and Katty Velasquez. Directed by Emily Mann (it has incorrectly been stated that Emily Mann directed the world premiere of Anna in the Tropics, the world premiere was directed by Rafael de Acha, artistic director of New Theatre, in Coral Gables, Florida. The following year, after being awarded the Pulitzer and Steinberg Awards, Emily Mann directed a production at the McCarter Theatre, which then was presented on Broadway.)  Bathing in Moonlight ran September 9 - October 9, 2016, at McCarter Theatre in Princeton, New Jersey. Bathing in Moonlight is the recipient of an Edgerton Foundation New Play Award and a 2016 Greenfield Prize.

Cruz is an alumnus of New Dramatists and has taught playwriting at Brown University, the University of Iowa and at Yale University. He presently lives in New York City and Miami.

Awards and honors

In 2003, Cruz received the Pulitzer Prize for Drama for his play Anna in the Tropics.

In 2009, Cruz received the PEN/Laura Pels International Foundation for Theater Award for a distinguished American playwright in mid-career.

In 2010, Cruz was awarded the honorary Doctor of Humane Letters (L.H.D.) from Whittier College.

Work

Plays
 Dancing on Her Knees (1994)
 Night Train to Bolina  (1995)
 A Park in Our House  (1995)
 Two Sisters and a Piano (1998)
 A Bicycle Country  (1999)
 Hortensia and the Museum of Dreams (2001)
 Anna in the Tropics (2002)
 Lorca in a Green Dress  (2003)
 Capricho (2003)
 Beauty of the Father (2006)
 The Color of Desire (2010)
 Hurricane (2010)
 Soto Voce (2014)
 Bathing in Moonlight (2016)
 Exquisita Agonía (Exquisite Agony) (2018)

Musicals
 Havana – music by Frank Wildhorn, lyrics by Jack Murphy, book by Cruz

Translations
 A Very Old Man With Enormous Wings – a children's play that is an adaptation of a short story by  Gabriel García Márquez
 Doña Rosita the Spinster – by Federico García Lorca
 The House of Bernarda Alba – by Federico García Lorca
 Life is a Dream – by Pedro Calderón de la Barca

See also

 List of Cuban Americans
 List of Cuban American writers
 Cuban American literature

References

External links

 
 
 
 Nilo Cruz Interview by Beth Stevens on Broadway.com
 New Plays And Playwrights – Working in the Theatre Seminar video at American Theatre Wing.org, January 2004
 Bomb magazine interview
 Articles about Nilo Cruz and Life is a Dream at South Coast Repertory

1960 births
Living people
20th-century American dramatists and playwrights
Brown University alumni
American writers of Cuban descent
Cuban emigrants to the United States
American male dramatists and playwrights
American gay writers
Pulitzer Prize for Drama winners
Hispanic and Latino American dramatists and playwrights
21st-century American dramatists and playwrights
People from Matanzas
American opera librettists
Exiles of the Cuban Revolution in the United States
20th-century American male writers
21st-century American male writers
American LGBT dramatists and playwrights